Mendy: A Question of Faith is a 2003 film about a Hasidic Jewish man who leaves his religiously devout community in Brooklyn to experience secular life in New York City. The film was written and directed by Adam Vardy.

The film's protagonist is a Hasidic man named Mendy (Ivan Sandomire) whose metamorphosis from a devotee of an insular faith to the secular world is contrasted with the life of Bianca (Gabriela Dias), a Brazilian exotic dancer.

Vardy's film was inspired by a 1997 Village Voice article about young Hasidic men from the Satmar community who left Hasidic Judaism to immerse themselves in modern, secular life.

See also 
 One of Us (2017)

References

External links 

Films about Orthodox and Hasidic Jews
Anti-Orthodox Judaism sentiment